Sorribas is one of 28 parishes (administrative divisions) in the municipality of Grado, within the province and autonomous community of Asturias, in northern Spain. 

The population is 38 (INE 2007).

Villages and hamlets
 Las Corujas 
 Sorribas

References

Parishes in Grado